Ford Island is a rocky Antarctic island,  long, between O'Connor and Cloyd Islands in the southern part of the Windmill Islands. It was first mapped from air photos taken by USN Operation Highjump and Operation Windmill in 1947 and 1948. It was named by the US-ACAN for Homer D. Ford, photographic officer with the eastern task group of Operation Highjump and assistant photographic officer with the Operation Windmill parties which obtained air and ground photos of this area in January 1948.

See also
 Composite Antarctic Gazetteer
 List of Antarctic and sub-Antarctic islands
 List of Antarctic islands south of 60° S
 SCAR
 Territorial claims in Antarctica

References

External links 

Windmill Islands